Cortlandt is a studio album by jazz artist Sean Malone. It was released in 1996.

Track listing (original release)
 Controversy (4:16)
 Splinter (3:21)
 Fisher's Gambit (5:17)
 Hand Full of Earth (6:20)
 Giant Steps (2:55) (John Coltrane)
 At Taliesin (4:09)
 Big Sky Wanting (6:00)
 The Big Idea (6:15)
 Sinfonia (Hidden Track) (33:06) a.k.a. Three-Part Invention in D minor
 Contains approximately 30 minutes of silence, then Bach's Sinfonia number 4 in D minor

Track listing (re-release)
 Controversy (4:16)
 Splinter (3:21)
 Fisher's Gambit (5:17)
 Hand Full of Earth (6:20)
 Sinfonia a.k.a. Three-Part Invention in D minor
 Giant Steps (2:55) (John Coltrane)
 At Taliesin (4:09)
 Big Sky Wanting (6:00)
 The Big Idea (6:15)
 Unquity Road (3:42) (Pat Metheny)
 Originally released as a bonus track on the Japanese version of the self-titled Gordian Knot album.

Artwork by Tim Spear (website)

Cortlandt was recorded in Tampa and Taos.

Personnel
Sean Malone - bass guitar, chapman stick, keyboards
Trey Gunn - warr guitar
Reeves Gabrels - guitars
Bob Brunin - guitars
Geoff Caputo - guitars
Glenn Snelwar - mandolins
Sean Reinert - drums, percussion

Trivia
 "Fisher's Gambit" is reworked and renamed "Fischer's Gambit" on Gordian Knot's second album Emergent.

1996 albums
Albums produced by Scott Burns (record producer)